Moscow Timiryazev Agricultural Academy (full name in ) is one of the oldest agrarian educational institutions in Moscow, Russia. It was founded on December 3, 1865. It is under the Supervisory of the Russian Ministry of Agriculture. It was named for Kliment Timiryazev, a Russian botanist and physiologist and major proponent of evolution by natural selection.

References

External links
  (in Russian)

Universities in Moscow
Agricultural universities and colleges in Russia
Educational institutions established in 1865
1865 establishments in the Russian Empire